Mirza Mohammad Torbati ( میرزا محمد تربتی), better known as Mushtaq Ali Shah (مشتاق علی شاه) was a Sufi mystic and a Muslim musician who was martyred for playing his instrument in 1792. Shah was a member of the Nimatullahi Order of Sufis, and a majdhoub, who attracted Ismailis and others when he sang and played his setar. Majdhoubs were "spiritual men whose mental faculties are as it were paralyzed or confused by the effect of the Divine attraction" and got "divinely intoxicated" when they performed. Shah disregarded the conventions of his day, and was accused of "singing and playing the call to prayer at the Jum'ah Masjid on 27th Ramadan (19 May) 1792, and was stoned to death.

In another account, he was accused of "reciting the Qur'an with the sound of a setar" by Mullah Mohammad Taqi (ملا محمد تقی), a mujtahid."

In addition to his historical role as a martyr, Mushtaq Ali Shah is remembered for his association with the setar. That instrument has had three strings for centuries, and in the 19th century was widely strung with a fourth string. Mushtaq Ali Shah is credited with adding the fourth string to his instrument before his death in 1791.

He is buried in the Mushtaqieh Square of Kerman, known as the Mushtaqieh Dome (The Dome of Desire) or the Three Domes.

See also
The Dome of Desire (Farsi language, Persian Wikipedia)

References

Iranian setar players
Iranian Muslim mystics
1792 deaths
Sufi mystics